Huntsdale is a village in Boone County, Missouri, United States. It is part of the Columbia, Missouri Metropolitan Statistical Area. The population was 31 at the 2010 census. The village was founded on August 1, 1892 and named after William Burch Hunt, a landowner. Huntsdale was first incorporated in 1906, but that status eventually fell into neglect and the last village council election took place in 1929. Due mainly to an influx of residential development in the area, Huntsdale was reincorporated in February 2003 and its first elections were held two months later. A center of activity in Huntsdale was Katfish Katy's, a small trail-side, seasonal restaurant along the Katy Trail State Park, until its closure in 2020. Katy's Little Lodge, formerly a bed and breakfast, was another notable business in the village.

Geography

Demographics

2010 census
As of the census of 2010, there were 31 people, 15 households, and 11 families residing in the village. The racial makeup of the village was 100.0% White. Hispanic or Latino of any race were 3.2% of the population.

There were 15 households, of which 6.7% had children under the age of 18 living with them, 40.0% were married couples living together, 20.0% had a female householder with no husband present, 13.3% had a male householder with no wife present, and 26.7% were non-families. 20.0% of all households were made up of individuals, and 13.4% had someone living alone who was 65 years of age or older. The average household size was 2.07 and the average family size was 2.09.

The median age in the village was 50.5 years. 3.2% of residents were under the age of 18; 6.5% were between the ages of 18 and 24; 32.3% were from 25 to 44; 45.2% were from 45 to 64; and 12.9% were 65 years of age or older. The gender makeup of the village was 48.4% male and 51.6% female.

References

Villages in Boone County, Missouri
Columbia metropolitan area (Missouri)
Villages in Missouri